WCSD-LP (104.9 FM) is a low-power FM radio station broadcasting a variety music format. Licensed to Shawnee-on-Delaware, Pennsylvania, United States, the station serves the Stroudsburg, Pennsylvania area. The station is currently owned by Shawnee Presbyterian Church.

History
The Federal Communications Commission issued a construction permit for the station on February 14, 2003. The station was assigned the WCSD-LP call sign on March 18, 2003, and received its license to cover on November 4, 2004.

Translators

References

External links
 

CSD-LP
Radio stations established in 2004
CSD-LP